Provincial elections were held in the Netherlands on Wednesday 2 March 2011. Eligible voters elected the members of the provincial councils in the twelve provinces. These elections also indirectly determined the members of the Senate, since the 566 members of the twelve provincial councils elected the Senate's 75 members in the Senate election on 23 May 2011.

The Senate election, and therefore the provincial elections, were important since the first Rutte cabinet had a minority in the Senate when it took office. The coalition and support parties hoped to gain a majority in the Senate through these elections, but failed to do so, obtaining 37 out of 75 seats. However, it was expected that the Reformed Political Party, which obtained one seat, would support the cabinet.

On the same date, Island Council elections were held in the three public bodies of the Caribbean Netherlands. It was planned that the members of the Island Councils would also have a vote in the Senate election in the future, but in 2011 this was not yet the case because this required a change in the Constitution.

Results

The right-liberal People's Party for Freedom and Democracy, left-liberal Democrats 66, and right-wing Party for Freedom made significant gains throughout the provinces. The Labour Party stayed relatively stable, while the Socialist Party suffered losses from their 2007 results. The Christian Democratic Appeal suffered big losses, losing some 65 of their previous 151 provincial seats. However, the party did not fare as poorly as the polls had suggested.

This was the first provincial elections that Geert Wilders' Party for Freedom participated in. The party managed to win seats in all of the Netherlands' provinces with its best results in the southern provinces of North Brabant and Limburg. In Limburg it even managed to become the biggest party by a slim margin.

National results

Due to population growth in Gelderland, the number of seats in the Provincial Council of Gelderland increased from 53 to 55, accounting for the increase in the total number of seats from 564 to 566.

By province

A "-" in the table means that the relevant party did not submit a list of candidates in the 2011 elections in the province concerned.

Drenthe

Flevoland

Friesland

Gelderland

Groningen

Limburg

North Brabant

North Holland

Overijssel

South Holland

Utrecht

Zeeland

Island council elections

References

External links
 Provinciale Statenverkiezingen 2011 States-Provincial Election 2011 from NRC Handelsblad (Dutch)

Provincial
2011
March 2011 events in Europe